The RV Bernicia is a research vessel owned and operated by diving organisation Bernicia Netherlands. It was previously operated by Newcastle University's Department of Marine Science and Technology, where it was used for research and teaching in the North Sea and in river estuaries, largely in the area of marine biology.

Operational history
The RV Bernicia is a small trawler-type vessel approximately 16 metres in length with hydraulically operated windlass and winches, and a crane on the aft deck. The research vessel was designed by Naval Architects from Newcastle University. When used by the university it was berthed at and operated from Blyth. In 2011 the Bernicia was replaced by a newer research vessel that was also partly designed by students at the university. This new vessel is RV The Princess Royal. RV Bernicia was sold to diving organisation Bernicia Netherlands.

Namesake
The RV Bernicia is named after the ancient Anglo Saxon Kingdom of the same name.

References

External links 
 
 

Newcastle University
Research vessels of the United Kingdom
Ships built on the River Tyne